Burning Down the Opera, released on 26 August 2003, is the first live album by the German power metal band Edguy recorded in Europe during their Mandrake World Tour.

A Limited Edition digibook is also available that includes a 32 pages expanded booklet with 130+ photos, all lyrics and a detailed venue list of the world tour 2001/2002 which took place on 5 continents. On top of that, a video clip of the Progpower festival in the USA will be provided as well as a desktop wallpaper and screen saver.

Track listing 
CD one
 "Welcome to the Opera (Intro)" - 2:08
 "Fallen Angels" - 5:33
 "Tears of a Mandrake" - 7:24
 "Babylon" - 7:01
 "Land of the Miracle" - 5:44
 "Painting on the Wall" - 4:37
 "Wings of a Dream" - 6:04
 "The Headless Game" - 7:20
 "The Pharaoh" - 15:07

CD two
 "Vain Glory Opera" - 6:27
 "Solitary Bunny (Drum Solo)" - 3:14
 "Save Us Now" - 4:53
 "How Many Miles" - 10:58
 "Inside" - 3:22
 "Avantasia" - 5:23
 "Out of Control" - 8:15

Personnel 
Band members
 Tobias Sammet - lead vocals
 Jens Ludwig - lead and rhythm guitar, backing vocals
 Dirk Sauer - lead and rhythm guitar, backing vocals
 Tobias 'Eggi' Exxel - bass, backing vocals
 Felix Bohnke - drums

Production
Michael Tibes - live engineer, mixing
Marc Schettler - live engineer 
Sascha Paeth - additional engineering
Mika Jussila - mastering at Finnvox Studios, Helsinki

References 

Edguy live albums
2003 live albums
AFM Records live albums